Jale Kaikadavu Vatubua (born 30 August 1991) is a Fijian rugby union player. His usual position is as a centre, and he currently plays for Pau in the Top 14 and the Fiji national team.

References

External links
 

1991 births
Living people
Fijian rugby union players
Fiji international rugby union players
Fijian expatriate sportspeople in Australia
Expatriate rugby union players in Australia
Fijian expatriate sportspeople in France
Expatriate rugby union players in France
Rugby union centres